Jan Legierski (born 10 March 1952 in Istebna) is a Polish former Nordic combined skier who competed in the 1976 Winter Olympics and in the 1980 Winter Olympics.

References

1952 births
Living people
Polish male Nordic combined skiers
Olympic Nordic combined skiers of Poland
Nordic combined skiers at the 1976 Winter Olympics
Nordic combined skiers at the 1980 Winter Olympics
People from Cieszyn County
Sportspeople from Silesian Voivodeship
20th-century Polish people